(lit. "Sanriku Reconstruction National Park") is a national park extending along the Sanriku Coast of Japan from Hachinohe in Aomori Prefecture through Iwate Prefecture to Kesennuma in Miyagi Prefecture. The national park was created on 24 May 2013 and covers a land area of

History
The park extended for 180 kilometers from north to south along the coastline of the Pacific Ocean from northern Miyagi prefecture to northern Iwate prefecture. On 24 May 2013 the park was incorporated into Sanriku Fukkō National Park. This was in the aftermath of the 2011 Tōhoku earthquake and tsunami. It also includes the former Tanesashi Kaigan Hashikamidake Prefectural Natural Park. On 31 March 2015, the Ministry of the Environment extended the park to include the former Minami Sanriku Kinkasan Quasi-National Park. Subsequently, the park will be extended to include Kesennuma Prefectural Natural Park, Kenjōsan Mangokuura Prefectural Natural Park, and Matsushima Prefectural Natural Park.

Geography
The entire coastline is noted for examples of sea erosion, with numerous rock pillars and islands. The northern coast is an example of an uplifted coastline, and is an area which has been subject to several strong earthquakes and tsunami in recent history. The southern coast is an example of a ria coastline of submerged river valleys, with deep inlets and narrow peninsulas, forming many small bays and coves.

The scenic coastal rock formations are nicknamed the "Alps of the Sea".

Related municipalities
Aomori: Hachinohe, Hashikami
Iwate: Fudai, Iwaizumi, Kamaishi, Kuji, Miyako, Noda, Ōfunato, Ōtsuchi, Rikuzentakata, Tanohata, Yamada
Miyagi: Ishinomaki, Kesennuma, Minamisanriku, Onagawa, Tome

Flora and Fauna
Flora includes groves of Japanese red pine, rhododendrons and Rosa rugosa. Fauna includes numerous bird species, including the black-tailed gull and shearwater. In terms of larger animals, there have also been sightings of the kamoshika.

Gallery

See also

List of national parks of Japan

References

External links
 Places of Interest in Sanriku Fukkō National Park
  Sanriku Fukkō National Park

National parks of Japan
Parks and gardens in Aomori Prefecture
Parks and gardens in Iwate Prefecture
Parks and gardens in Miyagi Prefecture
Protected areas established in 2013
Parks and gardens in Hachinohe
Hashikami, Aomori
Miyako, Iwate
Ōfunato, Iwate
Kuji, Iwate
Rikuzentakata, Iwate
Kamaishi, Iwate
Ōtsuchi, Iwate
Noda, Iwate
Yamada, Iwate
Iwaizumi, Iwate
Fudai, Iwate
Tanohata, Iwate
Ishinomaki
Kesennuma
Tome, Miyagi
Onagawa, Miyagi
Minamisanriku, Miyagi